Watercolors is the seventh studio album by American indie solo project Ducktails, released on June 21, 2019.

Reception 
Section26, a French music review website, gave a positive review of the album ending it with, "a loser has written a great album".

Track listing

References 

2019 albums
Ducktails (band) albums